Palunku was an Indian Malayalam-language soap opera. The show premiered on 22 November 2021 on Asianet. It stars Tejas Gowda and Tonisha Kapileswarapu in lead roles along with Subramanian Gopalakrishnan, Rajesh Hebbar and Lakshmi Priya in pivotal roles. It aires on Asianet and on-demand through Disney+ Hotstar. It is an official remake of Bengali TV series Khorkuto. The show ended on 30 December 2022.

Synopsis
Worlds and values clash when  headstrong and rich girl Nila meets aristocratic Deepak, a scientist. Adding fuel to this fiery combination in his family

Cast

Lead roles
 Tejas Gowda/ Tanuj Menon as Deepak: A young scientist
 Kushi Sampath Kumar / Tonisha Kapileswarapu as Nila: Deepak's wife

Recurring roles
 Subramanian Gopalakrishnan as Yadhu: Deepak's elder brother
 Rajesh Hebbar as Dr. Anirudhan: Nila's father
 Anjali Hari as Arunima
 Lakshmi Priya as Anuradha: Anirudhan's sister and Arunima's mother
 KPAC Rajkumar as Janardhanan
 Siva Kavitha as Padma Prabha
 Vijayan Karanthoor as Mukundan: Yadhu's father
 Lakshmi Balagopal as Karthika: Yadhu's wife
 Rasitha Aneesh as Saumini
 Ala S Nayana as Dr.Vimala: Nila's mother
 Jolly Easo as Saradha: Yadhu's mother
 Julie Hendry as Salma: Arunima's best friend
 Anjali Vinod as Samantha: Deepak's friend
 Sreekanth as 'Vadival' Sajeevan
Sumi santhosh as Pavithra 
 Roshna Thiyyath
 Jeeja Surendran

Guest
 Sreejith Vijay as Nikhil: Nila's elder brother (died in the serial)
 Gayatri Arun as herself
Devika unni
 Julie Henry as Salma

Adaptations

Reception
The show launched on 22 November 2021 at 8:30 PM IST. From beginning it doesn't got a good viewership. On 27 March 2022, the show is moved to afternoon slot of 1:30 PM due to low TRP and launch of Bigg Boss Season 4. The show ended on 30 December 2022 due to poor viewership.

References

Asianet (TV channel) original programming
Malayalam-language television shows
2021 Indian television series debuts